The 2017 Monster Energy FIM Speedway World Cup Race Off was the third race of the 2017 edition of the Speedway World Cup. It was run on July 7 at the Alfred Smoczyk Stadium in Leszno, Poland and was won by Russia from Australia, Latvia and the United States. As a result, Russia progressed to the 2017 Speedway World Cup Final, where they will join defending champions and hosts Poland, Event One winners Great Britain and Event Two winners Sweden. Australia finished second, but were eliminated from the competition along with Latvia and the United States.

Emil Sayfutdinov led Russia to victory with a 15-point maximum, and he was well supported by Gleb Chugunov, Andrey Kudryashov and Vadim Tarasenko. The Russian team still made the final without Grigory Laguta, who was suspended in the build-up to the event after failing a doping test. Jason Doyle top scored with 12 points for Australia, while Andžejs Ļebedevs was the star for Latvia with 18 points.

Results

Scores

References

See also 
 2017 Speedway Grand Prix

2017 Speedway World Cup